Immensee may refer to:

Immensee railway station, a railway station on the Gotthard railway line in Switzerland
Immensee (village), one of three villages in Küssnacht, Switzerland
Immensee (novella) (1848), a novella by German author Theodor Storm
Immensee (film) (1943), a German film directed by Veit Harlan